Corlăteni may refer to:

Corlăteni, a commune in Botoșani County, Romania
Corlăteni, a commune in Rîșcani District, Moldova